William White (25 September 1932 – 2015) was a Scottish professional footballer who played in the Football League for Accrington Stanley, Derby County and Mansfield Town.

References

1932 births
2015 deaths
Scottish footballers
Association football goalkeepers
English Football League players
Motherwell F.C. players
Accrington Stanley F.C. (1891) players
Bacup Borough F.C. players
Mansfield Town F.C. players
Derby County F.C. players
Alva Albion Rangers F.C. players